This is an incomplete list of men's Maccabiah medalists in fencing from 1932 to 2005.

Foil, Individual

Foil, Team

2022 Gold USA  (Nicholas Baumstein, Zack Binder, David Prilutsky).  Silver Israel  (Maor Hatoel, Niran Czuckermann, Aziz Shami).   Bronze Great Britain.

Épée, Individual

Épée, Team

Sabre, Individual

2017, gold, Eli Dershwitz, US.

Sabre, Team

 
 
Maccabiah, men
Fencing, men